This page shows the results of the Fencing Competition for men and women at the 2003 Pan American Games, held from August 2 to August 7, 2003 in Santo Domingo, Dominican Republic.

Results

Men's competition

Women's competition

Medal table

References
 Sports 123
 folha

P
2003
Events at the 2003 Pan American Games
International fencing competitions hosted by the Dominican Republic